() is a county of central Fujian province, People's Republic of China. It is placed under the jurisdiction of the Sanming City.

History
Before the year 1535, this area belonged to four counties: Youxi, Dehua, Yong'an and Zhangping. Datian County was set up and affiliated to Yanping Fu (延平府, modern Nanping) in 1535. The county changed affiliate to Yongchun Zhou (永春州, modern Yongchun County) in 1734, then to Yong'an Division (永安专区, modern Sanming Prefecture) in 1949.

Administrative divisions
Towns:
Junxi, Shangjing, Guangping, Taoyuan, Taihua, Jianshe, Shipai, Qitao

Townships:
Huaxing Township, Pingshan Township, Wushan Township, Jiyang Township, Wuling Township, Xieyang Township, Wenjiang Township, Meishan Township, Humei Township, Qianping Township

Demographics 
The population of the district was 362,566 inhabitants in 1999.

The people speak Datian Min, which is sometimes considered a dialect of Southern Min (Minnan), although due to its low intelligibility with the latter is also considered a separate branch of Min Chinese.

Climate

Notes and references

External links
 Government site 

County-level divisions of Fujian